Amblyseius is a large genus of predatory mites belonging to the family Phytoseiidae. Many members of this genus feed on other mites such as red spider mites, and also on thrips. Several species are popular as biological control agents to control these pests.

Species

A

 Amblyseius abbasovae Wainstein & Beglyarov, 1971
 Amblyseius acalyphus Denmark & Muma, 1973
 Amblyseius adhatodae Muma, 1967
 Amblyseius adjaricus Wainstein & Vartapetov, 1972
 Amblyseius aequipilus Berlese, 1914
 Amblyseius aerialis (Muma, 1955)
 Amblyseius alpigenus Wu, 1987
 Amblyseius alpinia Tseng, 1983
 Amblyseius americanus Garman, 1948
 Amblyseius ampullosus Wu & Lan, 1991
 Amblyseius anacardii De Leon, 1967
 Amblyseius andersoni (Chant, 1957)
 Amblyseius angulatus Karg, 1982
 Amblyseius animos Khan, Afzal & Akbar, 2000
 Amblyseius ankaratrae Blommers, 1976
 Amblyseius anomalus van der Merwe, 1968
 Amblyseius araraticus Arutunjan & Ohandjanian, 1972
 Amblyseius aricae Karg, 1976
 Amblyseius armeniacus Arutunjan & Ohandjanian, 1972
 Amblyseius asperocervix McMurtry & Moraes, 1985

B

 Amblyseius bahiensis Lofego, Moraes & McMurtry, 2000
 Amblyseius bayonicus Athias-Henriot, 1966
 Amblyseius begljarovi Abbasova, 1970
 Amblyseius bellatulus Tseng, 1983
 Amblyseius bidens Karg, 1970
 Amblyseius bidibidi (Collyer, 1964)
 Amblyseius boina Blommers, 1976
 Amblyseius brevicervix Wu & Li, 1985
 Amblyseius bufortus Ueckermann & Loots, 1988
 Amblyseius bulga Khan, Khan & Akbar, 1997

C

 Amblyseius calidum Khan, Afzal & Akbar, 2000
 Amblyseius carnis Khan, Khan & Akbar, 1997
 Amblyseius caspiansis (Denmark & Daneshvar, 1982)
 Amblyseius caudatus Berlese, 1914
 Amblyseius caviphilus Karg, 1986
 Amblyseius celsus Khan, Khan & Akbar, 1997
 Amblyseius cessator De Leon, 1962
 Amblyseius changbaiensis Wu, 1987
 Amblyseius chanioticus Papadoulis, 1997
 Amblyseius channabasavannai Gupta & Daniel, in Gupta 1978
 Amblyseius chiapensis De Leon, 1961
 Amblyseius chilcotti Chant & Hansell, 1971
 Amblyseius chorites Schuster & Pritchard, 1963
 Amblyseius chungas Denmark & Muma, 1989
 Amblyseius cinctus Corpuz-Raros & Rimando, 1966
 Amblyseius circumflexis De Leon, 1966
 Amblyseius coffeae De Leon, 1961
 Amblyseius colimensis Aponte & McMurtry, 1987
 Amblyseius collaris Karg, 1983
 Amblyseius comatus Ueckermann & Loots, 1988
 Amblyseius compositus Denmark & Muma, 1973
 Amblyseius corderoi Chant & Baker, 1965
 Amblyseius crassicaudalis Karg, 1998
 Amblyseius crowleyi Congdon, 2002
 Amblyseius cucurbitae Rather, 1985
 Amblyseius cupulus Denmark & Muma, 1989
 Amblyseius curiosus (Chant & Baker, 1965)
 Amblyseius curticervicalis Moraes & Mesa, in Moraes, Mesa & Braun 1991
 Amblyseius cydonus Ueckermann & Loots, 1988

D

 Amblyseius daliensis Liang & Ke, 1984
 Amblyseius deductus Chaudhri, Akbar & Rasool, 1979
 Amblyseius deleonellus Athias-Henriot, 1967
 Amblyseius denticulosus (Hirschmann, 1962)
 Amblyseius divisus De Leon, 1961
 Amblyseius duncansoni Specht & Rasmy, 1970
 Amblyseius duplicesetus Moraes & McMurtry, 1988

E

 Amblyseius eharai Amitai & Swirski, 1981
 Amblyseius erlangensis (Hirschmann, 1962)
 Amblyseius euanalis (Karg, 1983)
 Amblyseius euterpes Gondim Jr. & Moraes, 2001
 Amblyseius euvertex Karg, 1983
 Amblyseius excelsus Chaudhri, Akbar & Rasool, 1979

F

 Amblyseius faerroni Denmark & Evans, in Denmark, Evans, Aguilar, Vargas & Ochoa 1999
 Amblyseius fernandezi Chant & Baker, 1965
 Amblyseius fieldsi Denmark & Muma, 1989
 Amblyseius fijiensis McMurtry & Moraes, 1984
 Amblyseius filicinae Karg, 1998
 Amblyseius filixis Karg, 1970
 Amblyseius firmus Ehara, 1967
 Amblyseius fletcheri Schicha, 1981
 Amblyseius foenalis Berlese, 1914
 Amblyseius forfex Khan, Khan & Akbar, 1997
 Amblyseius franzellus Athias-Henriot, 1967
 Amblyseius fraterculus Berlese, 1916

G

 Amblyseius genualis De Leon, 1967
 Amblyseius geonomae Gondim Jr. & Moraes, 2001
 Amblyseius gliricidii De Leon, 1961
 Amblyseius gracilis (Garman, 1958)
 Amblyseius gramineous Wu, Lan & Zhang, 1992
 Amblyseius graminis Chant, 1956
 Amblyseius gruberi Denmark & Muma, 1989
 Amblyseius guianensis De Leon, 1966
 Amblyseius guntheri McMurtry & Schicha, 1987

H

 Amblyseius hainanensis Wu, in Wu & Qian 1983
 Amblyseius haleakalus Prasad, 1968
 Amblyseius hederae Denmark & Muma, 1989
 Amblyseius herbicoloides McMurtry & Moraes, 1984
 Amblyseius herbicolus (Chant, 1959)
 Amblyseius hexadens Karg, 1983
 Amblyseius humilis Khan, Khan & Akbar, 1997
 Amblyseius hurlbutti Denmark & Muma, 1989

I

 Amblyseius igarassuensis Gondim Jr. & Moraes, 2001
 Amblyseius impeltatus Denmark & Muma, 1973
 Amblyseius impressus Denmark & Muma, 1973
 Amblyseius incognitus Schuster, 1966
 Amblyseius indirae Gupta, 1985
 Amblyseius indocalami Zhu & Chen, 1983
 Amblyseius infundibulatus Athias-Henriot, 1961
 Amblyseius intermedius Gonzalez & Schuster, 1962
 Amblyseius invictus Schuster, 1966
 Amblyseius ipomoeae Ghai & Menon, 1967
 Amblyseius irinae Wainstein & Arutunjan, 1973
 Amblyseius ishizuchiensis Ehara, 1972
 Amblyseius isuki Chant & Hansel, 1971
 Amblyseius italicus (Chant, 1959)

J

 Amblyseius jailensis Kolodochka, 1981
 Amblyseius januaricus Wainstein & Vartapetov, 1973
 Amblyseius jilinensis Wu, 1987
 Amblyseius juliae Schicha, 1983

k

 Amblyseius kadii El-Halawany & Abdel-Samad, 1990
 Amblyseius kadzhajai Gomelauri, 1968
 Amblyseius kaguya Ehara, 1966
 Amblyseius kalandadzei Gomelauri, 1968
 Amblyseius keni Schicha, 1987
 Amblyseius kokufuensis Ehara & Kato, in Ehara, Okada & Kato 1994
 Amblyseius koreaensis Denmark & Muma, 1989
 Amblyseius koumacensis Schicha, 1981
 Amblyseius kulini Gupta, 1978

L

 Amblyseius largoensis (Muma, 1955)
 Amblyseius laselvius (Denmark & Evans, 1999)
 Amblyseius lassus Schuster, 1966
 Amblyseius lemani Tencalla & Mathys, 1958
 Amblyseius lencus Denmark & Evans, in Denmark, Evans, Aguilar, Vargas & Ochoa 1999
 Amblyseius lentiginosus Denmark & Schicha, 1974
 Amblyseius leonardi McMurtry & Moraes, 1989
 Amblyseius lianshanus Zhu & Chen, 1980
 Amblyseius lituatus Athias-Henriot, 1961
 Amblyseius longicollis Denmark & Evans, in Denmark, Evans, Aguilar, Vargas & Ochoa 1999
 Amblyseius longimedius Wang & Xu, 1991
 Amblyseius longisaccatus Wu, Lan & Liu, 1995
 Amblyseius longulus Berlese, 1914
 Amblyseius lynnae McMurtry & Moraes, 1989

M

 Amblyseius magnoliae Muma, 1961
 Amblyseius mahabaeus Schicha & Corpuz-Raros, 1992
 Amblyseius malovi Beglyarov, 1981
 Amblyseius martini Collyer, 1982
 Amblyseius martus De Leon, 1966
 Amblyseius matinikus Schicha & Corpuz-Raros, 1992
 Amblyseius mazatlanus Denmark & Muma, 1989
 Amblyseius mcmurtryi Muma, 1967
 Amblyseius megaporos De Leon, 1961
 Amblyseius meghriensis Arutunjan, 1968
 Amblyseius meridionalis Berlese, 1914
 Amblyseius microorientalis Wainstein & Beglyarov, 1971
 Amblyseius modestus (Chant & Baker, 1965)
 Amblyseius monacus Wainstein, 1975
 Amblyseius morii Ehara, 1967
 Amblyseius mountus Ryu, 1995
 Amblyseius multidentatus (Chant, 1959)
 Amblyseius muraleedharani Gupta, 1986
 Amblyseius murteri Schweizer, 1961

N

 Amblyseius nahatius Schicha & Corpuz-Raros, 1992
 Amblyseius nambourensis Schicha, 1981
 Amblyseius nayaritensis De Leon, 1961
 Amblyseius nemorivagus Athias-Henriot, 1961
 Amblyseius neoankaratrae Ueckermann & Loots, 1988
 Amblyseius neobernhardi Athias-Henriot, 1966
 Amblyseius neochiapensis Lofego, Moraes & McMurtry, 2000
 Amblyseius neocinctus Schicha & Corpuz-Raros, 1992
 Amblyseius neofijiensis Wu, Lan & Liu, 1995
 Amblyseius neofirmus Ehara & Okada, in Ehara, Okada & Kato 1994
 Amblyseius neolargoensis van der Merwe, 1965
 Amblyseius neolentiginosus Schicha, 1979
 Amblyseius neopascalis Wu & Ou, 2001
 Amblyseius neoperditus Moraes & Mesa, in Moraes, Mesa & Braun 1991
 Amblyseius neorykei Gupta, 1977
 Amblyseius newelli (Chant, 1960)
 Amblyseius nicola Chant & Hansell, 1971
 Amblyseius nonfraterculus Schicha, 1987

O

 Amblyseius oatmani Denmark, 1974
 Amblyseius obtuserellus Wainstein & Beglyarov, 1971
 Amblyseius obtusus (Koch, 1839)
 Amblyseius ochii Ehara & Yokogawa, 1977
 Amblyseius omaloensis Gomelauri, 1968
 Amblyseius oocarpus (Denmark & Evans, 1999)
 Amblyseius operculatus De Leon, 1967
 Amblyseius orientalis Ehara, 1959
 Amblyseius ovalitectus van der Merwe, 1968

P

 Amblyseius pamperisi Papadoulis, 1997
 Amblyseius paraaerialis Muma, 1967
 Amblyseius parabufortus (Denmark & Evans, 1999)
 Amblyseius parakaguya Denmark & Edland, 2002
 Amblyseius parasundi Blommers, 1974
 Amblyseius pascalis Tseng, 1983
 Amblyseius passiflorae Blommers, 1974
 Amblyseius patellae Karg, 1982
 Amblyseius paucisetis Wainstein, 1983
 Amblyseius paucisetosus McMurtry & Moraes, 1985
 Amblyseius perditus Chant & Baker, 1965
 Amblyseius perlongisetus Berlese, 1916
 Amblyseius perplexus Denmark & Evans, in Denmark, Evans, Aguilar, Vargas & Ochoa 1999
 Amblyseius phillipsi McMurtry & Schicha, in McMurtry & Moraes 1984
 Amblyseius piracicabae (Denmark & Muma, 1973)
 Amblyseius polisensis Schicha & Corpuz-Raros, 1992
 Amblyseius pravus Denmark, 1977
 Amblyseius pretoriaensis Ueckermann & Loots, 1988
 Amblyseius pritchardellus Athias-Henriot, 1967
 Amblyseius proresinae Karg, 1970
 Amblyseius punctatus Muma, Metz & Farrier, 1967
 Amblyseius pustulosus Karg, 1994

Q

 Amblyseius quichua McMurtry & Moraes, 1989

R

 Amblyseius raoiellus Denmark & Muma, 1989
 Amblyseius readshawi Schicha, 1987
 Amblyseius rhabdus Denmark, 1965
 Amblyseius riodocei El-Banhawy, 1984

S

 Amblyseius salinellus Athias-Henriot, 1966
 Amblyseius saltus (Zack, 1969)
 Amblyseius sangangensis Zhu & Chen, 1983
 Amblyseius santoensis Schicha, 1981
 Amblyseius saopaulus Denmark & Muma, 1973
 Amblyseius saurus De Leon, 1962
 Amblyseius schusteri (Chant, 1959)
 Amblyseius sculpticollis Denmark & Evans, in Denmark, Evans, Aguilar, Vargas & Ochoa 1999
 Amblyseius segregans De Leon, 1966
 Amblyseius sellnicki (Karg, 1960)
 Amblyseius serratus Karg, 1976
 Amblyseius shiganus Ehara, 1972
 Amblyseius siddiqui Khan & Chaudhri, 1969
 Amblyseius silvaticus (Chant, 1959)
 Amblyseius similicaudalis Karg, 1998
 Amblyseius similifloridanus (Hirschmann, 1962)
 Amblyseius similoides Buchellos & Pritchard, 1960
 Amblyseius sinuatus De Leon, 1961
 Amblyseius sinuatus Zhu & Chen, 1980
 Amblyseius sobrinulus Athias-Henriot, 1967
 Amblyseius solani Ramos & Rodriguez, 1997
 Amblyseius solus Denmark & Matthysse, in Matthysse & Denmark 1981
 Amblyseius sorakensis Ryu, 1995
 Amblyseius sparsus Kolodochka, 1990
 Amblyseius spiculatus Denmark & Muma, 1973
 Amblyseius stramenti Karg, 1965
 Amblyseius strobocorycus Wu, Lan & Liu, 1995
 Amblyseius subpassiflorae Wu & Lan, 1989
 Amblyseius subtilidentis Karg, 1993
 Amblyseius sumatrensis Ehara, 2002
 Amblyseius sundi Pritchard & Baker, 1962
 Amblyseius supercaudatus Karg, 1994
 Amblyseius swellendamensis Ueckermann & Loots, 1988
 Amblyseius swirskii Athias-Henriot, 1962
 Amblyseius sylvestris Denmark & Muma, 1989

T

 Amblyseius tamatavensis Blommers, 1974
 Amblyseius tee Schicha, 1983
 Amblyseius tenuis Wu & Ou, 2001
 Amblyseius tianmuensis Liang & Lao, 1994
 Amblyseius triangulus Wu, Lan & Zeng, 1997
 Amblyseius trisetosus Tseng, 1983
 Amblyseius tsugawai Ehara, 1959
 Amblyseius tubae Karg, 1970
 Amblyseius tuscus Berlese, 1914

U

 Amblyseius utricularius Karg, 1994
 Amblyseius utriculus Karg, 1989

V

 Amblyseius valpoensis Gonzalez & Schuster, 1962
 Amblyseius vasiformis Moraes & Mesa, in Moraes, Mesa & Braun 1991
 Amblyseius verginensis Papadoulis, 1995
 Amblyseius volcanus Prasad, 1968

W

 Amblyseius waltersi Schicha, 1981
 Amblyseius wangi (Yin, Bei & Lu, 1992)
 Amblyseius wanka Schicha & Corpuz-Raros, 1992
 Amblyseius williamsi Schicha, 1983
 Amblyseius wuyiensis Wu & Li, 1983

Y

 Amblyseius yadongensis Wu, 1987

Z

 Amblyseius zaheri Yousef & El-Brollosy, in Zaher 1986

References

External links 
 Amblyseius swirskii on the UF / IFAS Featured Creatures website.

Phytoseiidae